Richard Marsh (12 October 1857 – 9 August 1915) was the pseudonym of the English author born Richard Bernard Heldmann. A best-selling and prolific author of the late 19th century and the Edwardian period, Marsh is best known now for his supernatural thriller novel The Beetle, which was published the same year as Bram Stoker's Dracula (1897), and was initially even more popular, outselling Dracula six times over. The Beetle remained in print until 1960. Marsh produced nearly 80 volumes of fiction and numerous short stories, in genres including horror, crime, romance and humour. Many of these have been republished recently, beginning with The Beetle in 2004. Marsh's grandson Robert Aickman was a notable writer of short "strange stories".

Biography

Richard Bernard Heldmann was born on 12 October 1857, in North London, to lace merchant Joseph Heldmann (1827–96) and Emma Marsh (1830–1911), a lace-manufacturer's daughter. Heldmann began publishing fiction during 1880, in the form of boys' school and adventure stories for magazine publications. The most important of these was Union Jack, a quality boys' weekly magazine associated with authors G. A. Henty (1832–1902) and W.H.G. Kingston (1814–80). Henty promoted the young Heldmann to the position of co-editor in October 1882, but Heldmann's association with the publication was ended abruptly in June 1883. After this, Bernard Heldmann published no further fiction under that name, and began to use the pseudonym "Richard Marsh" a few years later.

For a long time the reasons for the end of Heldmann's business relationship with Henty and his adoption of a pseudonym were a mystery, with some scholars suggesting that Heldmann was anxious to obscure his father's German-Jewish origins. It has been discovered recently that in fact Heldmann had been sentenced to eighteen months' hard labour at the West Kent Quarter Sessions on 10 April 1884 for issuing a series of forged cheques in Britain and France during 1883.

Heldmann adopted his pseudonym on his release from jail, and fictions by "Richard Marsh" began appearing in literary periodicals during 1888, with two novels being published in 1893. Marsh wrote and published prolifically during the 1890s and the early years of the 20th century. He died from heart disease in Haywards Heath in Sussex on 9 August 1915. Several of his novels were published posthumously.

Fiction

The Beetle
Marsh's greatest commercial success was one of his earlier novels, The Beetle (1897). A story about a mysterious oriental person who pursues a British politician to London, where he wreaks havoc with his powers of hypnosis and shape-shifting, Marsh's novel is similar in some respects to certain other novels of the same period, such as Bram Stoker's Dracula, George du Maurier's Trilby, and Sax Rohmer's Fu Manchu novels. Like Dracula and many of the sensation novels pioneered by Wilkie Collins and others during the 1860s, The Beetle is narrated from the perspectives of multiple characters, a technique used in many late 19th-century novels (those of Wilkie Collins and Stoker, for example) to create suspense. The novel engages with numerous themes and problems of the Victorian fin de siècle, including the New Woman, unemployment and urban destitution, radical politics, homosexuality, science, and Britain's imperial engagements (in particular those in Egypt and the Sudan). "The Beetle" sold out upon its initial printing, and continued to sell well and to be published for several decades into the 20th century. The novel was made into a film in 1919, with Leal Douglas in "the polymorphous title role", and adapted for the London stage in 1928.

The first edition of The Beetle had four illustrations by John Williamson which are shown below. Vuohelainen states that these four illustrations illuminated "occult, criminal and romantic developments in the novel and thus appealing to different reader interests". Images by courtesy of the British Library.

Other novels
In addition to The Beetle, Marsh had several other successes in the genre of horror. Particularly notable among these are The Goddess: A Demon (1900), in which an Indian sacrificial idol comes to life with murderous intent, and The Joss: A Reversion (1901), in which an Englishman transforms himself into a hideous oriental idol. An important element of many of Marsh's novels, including The Beetle, is investigation of mystery, and several of his novels concern crime and its detection. In the novel Philip Bennion's Death (1897) a bachelor is discovered dead the day after discussing Thomas De Quincey's essay on murder as a fine art, and his neighbour and friend begins investigating the mystery. In The Datchet Diamonds (1898) a young man who has lost his fortune by the stock market accidentally swaps bags with a diamond thief, only then to find himself pursued by both the robbers and the police.

Marsh blends crime with science fiction in A Spoiler of Men (1905), the gentleman-criminal villain of which renders people slaves to his will by means of a chemical injection. Despite his success with popular fiction, Marsh seems also to have aspired to serious literary production, and his novel A Second Coming (1900) imagines Christ's return to an early-20th century London. Current scholarly research describes Marsh as a writer with a good sense of the literary market but who often transcended the ideological and aesthetic boundaries that his contemporaries established.

Short fiction
Marsh was also adept in the genre of short stories, publishing in literary periodicals such as Household Words, Cornhill Magazine, The Strand Magazine, and Belgravia, as well as in a number of book collections. The stories The Seen and the Unseen (1900), Marvels and Mysteries (1900), Both Sides of the Veil (1901) and Between the Dark and the Daylight (1902) (illustrated by Oscar Wilson) all feature an eclectic mix of humour, crime, romance and the occult.

He also published serial short stories, developing characters whose adventures could be related in discrete stories in numerous editions of a magazine. Mr. Pugh and Mr. Tress of Curios (1898) are rival collectors between whom pass a series of bizarre and discomfiting objects – poisoned rings, pipes which seem to come to life, a phonograph record on which a murdered woman seems to speak from the dead, and the severed hand of a 13th-century aristocrat. One of Marsh's most striking creations is Miss Judith Lee, a young teacher of deaf pupils whose lip-reading ability involves her with mysteries that she solves by acting as a detective. Another popular creation was Sam Briggs, whose fictional escapades as a young office clerk, and later as a soldier of World War I, were published by the magazine The Strand during the early 20th century.

Selected works 
 Daintree (1893)
 The Mahatma's Pupil (1893)
 The Devil's Diamond (1893)
 Mrs Musgrave and Her Husband (1895)
 The Beetle (1897)
 Crime and the Criminal (1897)
 The Duke and the Damsel (1897)
 The Mystery of Philip Bennion's Death (1897)
 The Datchet Diamonds (1898)
 The House of Mystery (1898)
 Curios: Some Strange Adventures of Two Bachelors (1898)
 A Second Coming (1900)
 The Goddess: A Demon (1900)
 The Seen and the Unseen (1900)
 Marvels and Mysteries (1900)
 Ada Vernham: Actress (1900) The book was illustrated with a frontispiece by Oscar Wilson.
 The Joss: A Reversion (1901)
 The Twickenham Peerage (1902)
 The Magnetic Girl (1903)
 Miss Arnott's Marriage (1903)
 The Confessions of a Young Lady: Her Doings and Misdoings (1905)
 A Spoiler of Men (1905)
 A Duel (1905)
 The Coward Behind the Curtain (1908)
 That Master of Ours (1908)
 Sam Briggs: His Book (1912)
 Judith Lee: Some Pages from Her Life (1912)
 The Adventures of Judith Lee (1916)
 Sam Briggs, V.C (1916)
 Violet Forster's Lover (1916)
 The Deacon's Daughter (1917)
 On the Jury (1918)
 The Master of Deception (1918)

Notes

References

Further reading
Robert Aickman. The Attempted Rescue. (London: Victor Gollancz, 1966).
William Baker, "Introduction", in Richard Marsh, The Beetle, ed. William Baker (Stroud: Allan Sutton Publishing and University of Luton, 1994): vii–x.
Richard Dalby, "Introduction", in Richard Marsh, The Haunted Chair and Other Stories, ed. Richard Dalby (Ashcroft: British Columbia, 1997): ix–xxi.
Richard Dalby, "Richard Marsh: Novelist Extraordinaire", Book and Magazine Collector, 163 (October 1997): 76–89.
Rhys Garnett, "Dracula and The Beetle: Imperial and Sexual Guilt and Fear in Late Victorian Fantasy", in Science Fiction Roots and Branches: Contemporary Critical Approaches, ed. Rhys Garnett and R.J. Ellis (Houndsmills: MacMillan, 1990): 30–54.
Hugh Greene, "Introduction" in (The Penguin Book of) Victorian Villainies, ed. Hugh Greene and Graham Greene (London: Bloomsbury, 1991): 7–10.
Judith Halberstam, "Gothic Nation: The Beetle by Richard Marsh" in Fictions of Unease: The Gothic from 'Otranto' to 'The X-Files''', ed. Andrew Smith, Diane Mason and William Hughes (Bath: Sulis Press, 2002): 100–18.
Johan Höglund, "Introduction", in Richard Marsh, A Spoiler of Men, ed. Johan Höglund (Kansas City: Valancourt Books, 2009).
Kelly Hurley, "'The Inner Chambers of All Nameless Sin': The Beetle, Gothic Female Sexuality, and Oriental Barbarism", in Gothic: Critical Concepts in Literary and Cultural Studies, ed. Fred Botting and Dale Townsend, 4 vols (London and New York: Routledge, 2004): III, 241–58.
Callum James, Archival copy of “Callum James's Literary Detective Agency, Case #1: Why Was Richard Marsh?” Front Free Endpaper, 30 November 2009.
Anna Maria Jones,  "Conservation of Energy, Individual Agency, and Gothic Terror in Richard Marsh's The Beetle, or, What's Scarier than an Ancient, Evil, Shape-shifting Bug?”, Victorian Literature and Culture 39.1 (2011): 65–85.
Robert Kirkpatrick, The Three Lives of Bernard Heldmann (London: Children's Books History Society, 2010).
Roger Luckhurst, "Trance-Gothic, 1882–1897", in Victorian Gothic: Literary and Cultural Manifestations in the Nineteenth Century, ed. Ruth Robbins and Julian Wolfreys (Basingstoke: Palgrave, 2000): 148–67.
Victoria Margree, "'Both in Men's Clothing': Gender, Sovereignty and Insecurity in Richard Marsh's The Beetle, Critical Survey, 19.2 (August 2007): 63–81.
Pittard, Christopher. "'The Unknown—with a capital U!' Richard Marsh and Victorian Popular Fiction." Clues: A Journal of Detection 27.1 (Fall 2008): 99–103.
Minna Vuohelainen. "Introduction", in Richard Marsh, The Beetle: A Mystery, ed. by Minna Vuohelainen (Kansas City: Valancourt, 2008): vii–xli.
Minna Vuohelainen. "Distorting the Genre, Defining the Audience, Detecting the Author: Richard Marsh's 'For Debt' (1902)." Clues: A Journal of Detection 25.4 (Summer 2007): 17–26.
Minna Vuohelainen. "Richard Marsh's The Beetle: A Late-Victorian Popular Novel', Working with English: Medieval and Modern Language, Literature and Drama, 2.1 (2006): 89–100.
Minna Vuohelainen. "'Oh to Get Out of That Room!': Outcast London and the Gothic Twist in the Popular Fiction of Richard Marsh", in Victorian Space(s), ed. Karen Sayer, Leeds Centre Working Papers in Victorian Studies 8 (2006): 115–26.
Minna Vuohelainen,  Richard Marsh, 2015, University of Wales Press, distributed by University of Chicago Press
Minna Vuohelainen. Richard Marsh – Victorian Fiction Research Guide
Julian Wolfreys, "The Hieroglyphic Other: The Beetle, London and, the Abyssal Subject', in A Mighty Mass of Brick and Smoke: Victorian and Edwardian Representations of London, ed. Lawrence Phillips (Amsterdam: Rodopi, 2007): 169–92.
Julian Wolfreys, "Introduction", in Richard Marsh, The Beetle'', ed. Julian Wolfreys (Peterborough, Ontario: Broadview Press, 2004): 9–34.

External links 

 
 
 
 
 A Monstrous Creature of the Beetle Tribe, British Library Writing Britain Curator's Blog (2012)
 
 
 Collected Works of Richard Marsh at Delphi Classics
 
 Book summary for The Complete Adventures of Judith Lee (1912–16) at Black Coat Press

1857 births
1915 deaths
19th-century British novelists
20th-century British novelists
Victorian novelists
British male novelists
Writers of Gothic fiction
19th-century pseudonymous writers
20th-century pseudonymous writers